Bødalen may refer to the following locations:

Bødalen in Asker municipality, Viken, Norway
Bødalen in Gausdal municipality, Innlandet, Norway
Bødalen in Stryn municipality, Vestland, Norway